Aymen Souda (born 28 February 1993 in Nice) is a French footballer who plays as a forward for RC Grasse in Championnat National 2.

Club career
Souda trained originally with Nice, he has previously played in Brasil, Tunisia, Bulgaria, Romania and Scotland.

In February 2021, Souda signed with Sète.

In June 2022, Souda moved down to the fourth-tier Championnat National 2 and signed with RC Grasse.

Personal life

Born in France, Souda is of Tunisian descent.

References

External links

1993 births
Living people
Footballers from Nice
French footballers
Association football forwards
French sportspeople of Tunisian descent
Paraná Clube players
Étoile Sportive du Sahel players
AS Kasserine players
FC Lokomotiv Gorna Oryahovitsa players
PFC Lokomotiv Plovdiv players
OFC Pirin Blagoevgrad players
FC Dunărea Călărași players
Livingston F.C. players
FC Sète 34 players
US Orléans players
RC Grasse players
First Professional Football League (Bulgaria) players
Liga I players
Scottish Professional Football League players
Championnat National players
French expatriate footballers
Expatriate footballers in Brazil
Expatriate footballers in Spain
Expatriate footballers in Turkey
Expatriate footballers in Bulgaria
Expatriate footballers in Romania
Expatriate footballers in Scotland
French expatriate sportspeople in Brazil
French expatriate sportspeople in Spain
French expatriate sportspeople in Turkey
French expatriate sportspeople in Bulgaria
French expatriate sportspeople in Romania
French expatriate sportspeople in Scotland